Benjamin Chang is the vice president for communications and spokesperson for Columbia University. He previously worked in communications at Princeton University, in public relations at Burson Cohn & Wolfe, and as vice president and events editor for the Los Angeles Times. Previously, he served as Associate Administrator for Communications and Public Liaison at the Small Business Administration.  From 2012 to 2015, he was the Senior Vice President for Communications at the Albright Stonebridge Group. 

Chang served as a career Foreign Service Officer at the Department of State for almost 18 years. He worked in the Department of State's Bureau of Public Affairs as Senior Advisor for Strategic Planning and Crisis Communications, and as the Director for Press and Communications at the National Security Council during both the Bush and Obama Administrations.

Background and education
In high school, Chang visited both Central America and the former Soviet Union, where he developed an interest in international relations.

He attended Georgetown University, where he graduated from the School of Foreign Service.

Foreign Service Officer career
Chang has served as a Foreign Service Officer in the State Department, with postings in El Salvador, Paris at the Organisation for Economic Co-operation and Development, in New York at the United Nations, and in Washington, D.C., working at for Secretaries Albright and Powell.

From 2004 to 2008, he was Deputy Spokesman on Richard Grenell's staff at the United States Mission to the United Nations.

In 2012, Chang served as principal of the Podesta Group, a lobbying and public affairs firm.

Personal life
Chang is a photographer and DJ. As a photographer, Chang specializes in documentary-style backstage photography in both the fashion and music worlds.

Chang was named one of PAPER Magazine's 64 Most Beautiful People of 2008 and one of Politico's "50 to Watch" in 2013. He spoke about letting his personal passions impact his "day job" in his closing remarks at TEDxAix in 2014.

References

External links
 Washington Diplomat Article
 On the Inside Bio
 NY Daily News Article
 Politico's "Click" profile by Amie Parnes

Living people
Walsh School of Foreign Service alumni
United States Department of State officials
American diplomats
Year of birth missing (living people)